Les Lewis is the name of

 Les Lewis (footballer) (born 1926), Australian rules footballer 
 Leslie Lewis (sprinter) (1924–1986), British sprinter